Matthew Srbely (born November 29, 1998) is a Canadian professional soccer player who currently plays as a midfielder for Cork City, on loan from the Tampa Bay Rowdies.

Career 
A product of the Toronto FC Academy, Srbely played with Toronto FC III's Premier Development League and League1 Ontario sides in 2016 before moving to their United Soccer League side in 2017, signing his first professional contract with Toronto FC II on March 8, 2017. He made his professional debut on August 13, 2017 in a 3-1 loss to Bethlehem Steel, coming on as a 68th minute midfield substitute for Aikim Andrews. He received his first professional start on August 19, 2017 away against the Richmond Kickers. Srbely became a regular fixture in the Toronto FC II lineup in 2018, finishing secong on the team in games played with 19, logging the third most minutes with 2,078. He scored his first professional goal on March 17, 2018 against New York Red Bulls II. He was awarded USL First Team of the Week honours for his performance after leading Toronto FC II to its first victory of the season, a 2-0 victory over Nashville SC, adding a goal and an assist. The following season he was named to the USL League One Team of the Week three times. Due to the COVID-19 pandemic, Toronto FC II withdrew from the 2020 USL League One season and, in September 2020, Srbely was loaned to Danish 2nd Division club Thisted FC until the end of the 2020 season. He made five appearances with Thisted FC before their season was abruptly postponed in Denmark due to COVID-19 concerns in the North Jutland region of Denmark in early November 2020.

On February 18, 2021, Srbely signed a two-year deal with USL Championship club Tampa Bay Rowdies. He made his debut on May 1 against Charlotte Independence.

On February 2, 2022, Srbely joined Cork City in the League of Ireland First Division on a season-long loan. He made his debut on February 18 in a substitute appearance against Bray Wanderers.

Career statistics

References 

1998 births
Living people
Canadian soccer players
Association football midfielders
Soccer players from Brampton
Tampa Bay Rowdies players
Toronto FC players
Toronto FC II players
USL Championship players
USL League One players
USL League Two players
Thisted FC players
Canadian expatriate soccer players
Expatriate men's footballers in Denmark
Canadian expatriate sportspeople in Denmark
Expatriate soccer players in the United States
Canadian expatriate sportspeople in the United States
North Mississauga SC players
Cork City F.C. players
Canadian expatriate sportspeople in Ireland
Expatriate association footballers in Ireland